Laffa, also known as lafa or Iraqi pita, is a large, thin flatbread in Israeli cuisine with an Iraqi origin. Laffa is a simple bread that is traditionally dairy-free and vegan and cooked in a tannur (tandoor) or taboon oven. It is most often used to wrap falafel, kebab, and shawarma to make sandwiches, to dip in hummus, matbucha and other dips, or with shakshouka, and other dishes. It is also the traditional bread used in sabich, an Israeli eggplant sandwich. 

Laffa is similar to many tandoor breads found in Asia including naan and pita. Though they are similar, laffa is unique in that it does not form a pocket and is much thicker and chewier than pita or naan.

History

Laffa is known as Iraqi pita given its origin among the Iraqi Jewish. Members of the Jewish community of Iraq, almost all of whom emigrated to Israel in the mid-20th century, brought with them the standard Iraqi flatbread known as aish tannur or simply khubz (bread). Laffa was traditionally bread in  communal outdoor wood or coal-fired ovens and served as an accompaniment to a myriad of dishes.

Preparation

Laffa is prepared by creating a dough typically made up of flour, water, yeast, salt, sugar, and olive oil combined over a long fermentation process. The dough is kneaded and then often left to rise for several hours or overnight. It is then divided into several balls of dough, which are then left to rise again. Afterwards, the dough is then rolled out into a large, thin piece, much thinner than a pita, and cooked for several minutes until it has risen slightly and cooked through. For the cooking process, laffa was traditionally baked in a wood- or coal-fired oven, similar to a tandoor. In modern times a pizza oven, outdoor grill, stovetop, frying pan, or oven is more often used. After baking, laffa is often finished with olive oil and za'atar.

While laffa and pita are similar in appearance, different leavening processes creates significantly different outcomes. Pita only undergoes moderate leavening, while laffa can be fermented days on end. This leads pita to have a thinner and crispier texture while laffa is much thicker and chewier.

Culinary Use 
Laffa's simplicity makes it an ideal pairing for a variety of different dishes. In particular, its durable texture makes it ideal for dipping and thus it is frequently paired with dips such as hummus and other mezzes. It is the traditional bread used in sabich, and is also commonly used to wrap sandwiches in such as falafel, shawarma, ground-meat kebabs, and others.

Laffa has distinct regional variations. In Iraq, any sandwich or wrap made with this bread is called a laffa. On the other hand, the name laffa refers to the bread itself. In Israel, laffa is often used as a general term. For instance, Israelis may refer to both taboon bread and the thinner sajj bread as "laffa".

Laffa's simplicity also results in several health benefits. It is a strong source of protein and carbohydrates, while having relatively few calories.

See also
Falafel
Saj bread (also known as yufka)
Markook shrek

References

Israeli cuisine
Mizrahi Jewish cuisine
Jewish cuisine
Jewish breads
Flatbreads
Sandwiches
Iraqi-Jewish culture in Israel